The Journal of Cosmetic Dermatology is a quarterly peer-reviewed medical journal published by Wiley-Blackwell. It is the official journal of the International Academy of Cosmetic Dermatology and covers all aspects of cosmetic dermatology. The editor-in-chief is Zoe Diana Draelos. The journal was established in 2002. According to the Journal Citation Reports, the journal has a 2014 impact factor of 0.876.

References

External links 
 
 Print: 
 Online: 

Wiley-Blackwell academic journals
Dermatology journals
Publications established in 2002
English-language journals
Quarterly journals